Tom Horton (born 18 April 1997 in Australia) is an Australian rugby union player for Western Force, based in Perth, Australia, who play in Super Rugby.  He has previously played for the NSW Waratahs in Super Rugby and for Leicester Tigers in England's Premiership Rugby. His playing position is hooker. He has signed to the Waratahs squad for the 2020 season.

In August 2022 Horton signed for Leicester Tigers in England's Premiership Rugby on a short term deal. Head coach Steve Borthwick described Horton as "tough, hard-working". He was released on 16 December 2022.

Reference list

External links
Rugby.com.au profile
itsrugby.co.uk profile

1997 births
Australian rugby union players
Living people
Leicester Tigers players
Rugby union hookers
New South Wales Waratahs players
New South Wales Country Eagles players
Western Force players